Joshua Charles Tongue (born 15 November 1997) is an English cricketer who plays for Worcestershire County Cricket Club. A right-arm fast-medium pace bowler, who also bats right-handed. He made his first-class debut for Worcestershire against the Oxford MCC University side in March 2016. He made his List A debut for Worcestershire in the 2017 Royal London One-Day Cup on 5 May 2017.

References

External links
 

1997 births
Living people
Sportspeople from Redditch
People educated at King's School, Worcester
English cricketers
Worcestershire cricketers